Vikramaditya Singh (born 17 October 1989) is an Indian politician, who currently serves as Member of Legislative Assembly from Shimla Rural constituency. He is the son of the former chief minister of Himachal Pradesh Late Virbhadra Singh. His mother is Pratibha Singh, a Member of Parliament from Mandi, Lok Sabha Constituency.

On 10 July 2021, after the death of his father on July 8, Vikramaditya Singh was crowned the titular king of the erstwhile princely state of Bushahr in a private ceremony at Padam Palace in Rampur.

Early life and education
Vikramaditya Singh was born on 17 October 1989 in Shimla district in the royal family of the princely state of Bushahr. He is son of Late Raja Virbhadra Singh, six time former chief minister of Himachal Pradesh and former Member of Parliament Pratibha Singh.

Vikramaditya Singh did his schooling from Bishop Cotton School, Shimla. He did his Graduation and Post-Graduation in History from Delhi University. Vikramaditya pursued his graduation B.A. in history from Hansraj College (DU) and post-graduate degree M.A. (Hons.) in History from  St. Stephen's College, Delhi.

Politics
Vikramaditya's active state political journey started in 2013 and he associated with HP Congress Committee. He was elected as Himachal Pradesh state youth congress president in year 2013 until the year 2017.

In 2017, he won from Shimla Rural constituency as the Member of Legislative Assembly for Himachal Pradesh Legislative Assembly and again in 2022.
Later, On 8 January 2023 he became PWD, Youth Services & Sports Minister of Himachal Pradesh in Sukhwinder Singh Sukhu Ministry.

References

Notes

Citations 

Indian National Congress politicians from Himachal Pradesh
1989 births
Living people
Indian National Congress politicians
Himachal Pradesh MLAs 2017–2022
Bishop Cotton School Shimla alumni